Ghislain Anselmini (born 6 May 1970 in Le Coteau, Loire) is a French former professional footballer who played as a left-sided defender. He played in Ligue 1 with Olympique Lyonnais.

Honours
Lyon
 UEFA Intertoto Cup: 1997

References

External links

Living people
1970 births
People from Le Coteau
Sportspeople from Loire (department)
French footballers
Footballers from Auvergne-Rhône-Alpes
Association football defenders
Olympique Lyonnais players
En Avant Guingamp players
US Créteil-Lusitanos players
Ligue 1 players
Ligue 2 players